Neverstore is a Swedish punk rock band. The band was formed in 2000 in Skövde. 
Neverstore released their first album, Sevenhundred Sundays January 24, 2007. The songs So Much of Not Enough and L.Y.D. (Live Your Dreams) were included on the album. Shortly after they released a new single, "Stay Forever". 
Neverstore have several times opened up for Backyard Babies and in May, 2007 they opened up for Good Charlotte while on tour in Sweden. During 2008 Neverstore were on tour in Japan with the Canadian rock band Sum 41. This tour gave Neverstore a large audience in Japan. 
Neverstore's second studio album was released on February 27, 2008. This album is called Heroes Wanted. The band has recently been in Los Angeles, for recording of the new single Summer which is produced by Deryck Whibley from Sum 41. 
In the end of January 2010 the third album, Age of Hysteria was released. It contains the singles "Summer" and "Shallow Beautiful People". Neverstore is now busy making new songs for their new album. They expect it to be finished after summer holidays.

Discography
2007: Sevenhundred Sundays
2008: Heroes Wanted
2010: Age of Hysteria
2013: Neverstore

References
https://web.archive.org/web/20090901195944/http://www.neverstore.com/
 MTV Europe Music Awards 2007#Best Swedish Act
 MTV Europe Music Awards 2008#Best Swedish Act

External links
 
 Neverstore on Myspace

Swedish alternative rock groups
Swedish punk rock groups
MTV Europe Music Award winners
English-language singers from Sweden
Melodifestivalen contestants of 2015